Santorio is an Italian surname that may refer to
Francesco Antonio Santorio (died 1589), Roman Catholic prelate
Giovanni Antonio Santorio (died 1628), Roman Catholic prelate
Giovanni Battista Santorio (died 1592), Roman Catholic prelate
Giulio Antonio Santorio (1532–1602), Cardinal of the Roman Catholic Church
Santorio Santorio (1561–1636), Italian physiologist and physician

See also
 Santori
 Santoro

Italian-language surnames